Prunus schlechteri, aimangelo, is a species of Prunus native to New Guinea and the Solomon Islands. It is a tree reaching 35m. Native peoples chew a pulp of its bark to alleviate the pain of toothaches or apply it externally to relieve aching muscles.

References

schlechteri
Flora of Papuasia
Plants described in 1913
Medicinal plants